Tamsin Georgina Carroll (born 13 February 1979) is an Australian actress.  She is best known for her performances in musical theatre in Australia and the United Kingdom.

Personal life 
Carroll was born and raised in Sydney.  Her parents are Australian actor Peter Carroll and Trisha, a former historian and archivist for the Sydney Theatre Company.

Carroll met her British husband while performing in the West End revival of Oliver!.

Career
At the age of five, Carroll was an extra in the television western series Five Mile Creek which featured her father.  She made her professional stage debut in a Sydney Theatre Company production of Six Characters in Search of an Author in 1987. Her early adult roles included Little Red Ridinghood in Into the Woods opposite her father as the Narrator/Mysterious Man (Melbourne Theatre Company) and Vicki in Long Gone Lonesome Cowgirls (Railway Street Theatre, Penrith).  Carroll first received wide notice as Marianne Renate in the Australian tour of the Johnny O'Keefe jukebox musical Shout! The Legend of the Wild One (Kevin Jacobsen Productions) which opened in Melbourne in 2000.

Subsequent roles as Nancy in Oliver! (IMG/Cameron Mackintosh, Australian tour and Singapore) and Dusty Springfield in Dusty - The Original Pop Diva (Dusty Productions, Australian tour) won Carroll multiple awards.

Other leading roles in Australian theatre and musical theatre include Marta in Company (Kookaburra), Isabella in Measure for Measure (Bell Shakespeare), Rizzo in Grease – The Arena Spectacular (SEL/GFO), Tracy Lord in High Society, Rose in Bye Bye Birdie and Sheila in Hair (The Production Company), Vixen in The Threepenny Opera (Belvoir Street Theatre Bogata Festival), Allie in Harbour and Olivia in The Republic of Myopia (Sydney Theatre Company).

English theatre credits include Emma Goldman in Ragtime and Titania in A Midsummer Night’s Dream (Open Air Theatre, Regent's Park), alternate Nancy in Oliver! (Theatre Royal Drury Lane) and Ensemble in The Magistrate (Royal National Theatre).

Her film and television credits include EastEnders, Goddess, Carols by Candlelight and Holy Smoke!.

She played the role of Ellen in the West End revival of Miss Saigon and Baroness Bomburst in the UK tour of Chitty Chitty Bang Bang.

In 2017 she appeared in the new musical Everybody's Talking About Jamie at the Crucible Theatre, Sheffield. She subsequently reprised the role when the show transferred to London's West End, playing at the Apollo Theatre from 6 November 2017.

Awards
 2002 Green Room Award for Best Female Actor in a Leading Role (Music Theatre) - Oliver!
 2003 Helpmann Award for Best Female Actor in a Musical - Oliver!
 2006 Helpmann Award for Best Female Actor in a Musical - Dusty - the Original Pop Diva
 2006 Green Room Award for Best Female Actor in a Leading Role (Music Theatre) - Dusty - The Original Pop Diva

Mo Awards
The Australian Entertainment Mo Awards (commonly known informally as the Mo Awards), were annual Australian entertainment industry awards. They recognise achievements in live entertainment in Australia from 1975 to 2016. Tamsin Carroll won one award in that time.
 (wins only)
|-
| 2002
| Tamsin Carroll
| Female Musical Theatre Performance of the Year
| 
|-

References

Australian musical theatre actresses
Australian expatriates in England
Helpmann Award winners
Living people
1979 births